Jewett City is a borough in New London County, Connecticut, in the town of Griswold. The population was 3,487 at the 2010 census. The borough was named for Eliezer Jewett, who founded a settlement there in 1771.

Geography

Demographics

As of the census of 2000, there were 3,053 people, 1,337 households, and 743 families residing in the borough. The racial makeup of the borough was 92.07% White, 2.46% African American, 0.88% Native American, 1.44% Asian, 0.07% Pacific Islander, 1.11% from other races, and 1.97% from two or more races. Hispanic or Latino of any race were 2.85% of the population.

There were 1,337 households, out of which 29.2% had children under the age of 18 living with them, 34.8% were married couples living together, 15.7% had a female householder with no husband present, and 44.4% were non-families. 34.2% of all households were made up of individuals, and 11.4% had someone living alone who was 65 years of age or older. The average household size was 2.27 and the average family size was 2.92.

The population in the borough was spread out, with 23.9% under the age of 18, 9.7% from 18 to 24, 34.8% from 25 to 44, 18.7% from 45 to 64, and 12.9% who were 65 years of age or older. The median age was 34 years. For every 100 females, there were 98.1 males. For every 100 females age 18 and over, there were 95.5 males.

The median income for a household in the borough was $42,318, and the median income for a family was $45,826. Males had a median income of $31,919 versus $22,463 for females. The per capita income for the borough was $19,083. 9.2% of the population and 8.8% of families were below the poverty line. 12.7% of those under the age of 18 and 12.2% of those 65 and older were living below the poverty line.

The Daily Show
Jewett City was featured on The Daily Show with Jon Stewart after being at the center of a church bell controversy. The episode, which aired on March 6, 2007, held a segment called "Sam on Your Side" with the main focus on the ringing of the Jewett City bells.

See also
Jewett City Vampires

Gallery

Notes

References

External links

 Town of Griswold official web site

Boroughs in Connecticut
Populated places in New London County, Connecticut
Griswold, Connecticut